Fengbang is a station that is part of Line 14 of the Shanghai Metro. Located at the intersection of Xiangfeng Road and Cao'an Highway in the city's Jiading District, the station is named after the nearby town of Fengbang and serves as the western terminus of the line when it opened on December 30, 2021.

References 

Railway stations in Shanghai
Shanghai Metro stations in Jiading District
Line 14, Shanghai Metro
Railway stations in China opened in 2021